History Ireland is a magazine with a focus on the history of Ireland. The first issue of the magazine appeared in Spring 1993. It went full-colour in 2004 and since 2005 it is published  bi-monthly. It features articles by a range of writers and book reviews. The magazine's editor is Tommy Graham of the Tisch School of the Arts, New York University, Dublin Programme.

References

External links
Magazine website
Index to History Ireland
How a History Ireland Cover was produced

1993 establishments in Ireland
Bi-monthly magazines
Historiography of Ireland
History magazines
Magazines published in Ireland
Magazines established in 1993
Mass media in Dublin (city)